Hybocoptus is a genus of dwarf spiders that was first described by Eugène Louis Simon in 1884.  it contains only three species, found in Algeria, France, and Morocco: H. corrugis, H. dubius, and H. ericicola.

See also
 List of Linyphiidae species (A–H)

References

Araneomorphae genera
Linyphiidae
Spiders of Africa